Type 41 may refer to:

Japanese Guns
 Type 41 75 mm Mountain Gun, a Japanese weapon
 Type 41 75 mm Cavalry Gun, a Japanese weapon
 Type 41 3-inch (7.62 cm)/40-caliber naval gun, a Japanese weapon
 Type 41 4.7 inch 40 caliber naval gun, a Japanese weapon
 Type 41 6-inch (152 mm)/40-caliber naval gun, a Japanese weapon
 Type 41 6-inch (152 mm)/45-caliber naval gun, a Japanese weapon
 Type 41 6-inch (152 mm)/50-caliber naval gun, a Japanese weapon
 Type 41 8-inch (203 mm)/45-caliber naval gun, a Japanese weapon
 Type 41 10 inch 40-caliber naval gun, a Japanese weapon
 Type 41 10 inch 45 caliber naval gun, a Japanese weapon
 Type 41 12-inch (305 mm)/40-caliber naval gun, a Japanese weapon
 Type 41 12-inch 45 caliber naval gun, a Japanese weapon
 Type 41 14-inch (356 mm)/45-caliber naval gun, a Japanese weapon

British warships
 Type 41 frigate, the Leopard class of anti-aircraft defence frigates built for the Royal Navy

Land vehicles
 Bugatti Royale, formally named Type 41
 Lotus 41 race car
 British Rail Class 41 (HST) locomotive
 British Rail Class 41 (Warship Class) locomotive